Jon Bowermaster (born June 29, 1954) is an oceans expert, journalist, author, filmmaker, adventurer and six-time grantee of the National Geographic Expeditions Council. One of the Society’s ‘Ocean Heroes,’ his first assignment for National Geographic Magazine was documenting a 3,741 mile crossing of Antarctica by dogsled.

Jon has written eleven books and produced/directed more than thirty documentary films. His feature documentaries include ‘Dear President Obama,’ ‘Antarctica, on the Edge,’ ‘After the Spill’ and ‘Ghost Fleet.’  He is a longtime contributor to magazines ranging from The New York Times Magazine and The Atlantic to Outside and Rolling Stone.

His National Geographic-sponsored Oceans 8 project took him and his teams around the world by sea kayak over the course of ten years (1999-2008), bringing back stories from the Aleutian Islands to French Polynesia, Gabon to Tasmania, and more, reporting on how the planet’s one ocean, its residents and various coastlines are faring in today’s busy world. The project resulted in an eight-part television series for the National Geographic Channel.

For the past several years, Jon and his One Ocean Media Foundation / Oceans 8 Films team have focused on Hudson River Stories, a series of short films about the environmental risks to and hopes for the Hudson River Valley, the birthplace of the American environmental movement.

Jon is a Visiting Lecturer at Bard College, in the Environment and Urban Studies Department. He hosts weekly radio show/podcast, ‘The Green Radio Hour with Jon Bowermaster' on Radio Kingston.

Jon lives in New York’s Hudson Valley and is the President of the One Ocean Media Foundation and Chairman of the Advisory Board of Adventurers and Scientists for Conservation.

Background and education
Born in Normal, Illinois, in 1954, Jon grew up in suburbs of Chicago and Rockford, Ill., until attending Drake University in Des Moines, Iowa, where he worked at the Des Moines Register for two years as a student. He graduated in 1976 with a bachelor's degree in journalism. In 1977, Jon received his master's degree in public affairs reporting from American University in Washington, DC.

Career

Early career
After graduate school, Jon moved to New York City to work for New Times magazine, before returning to Iowa as co-founder and editor of the weekly alternative newspaper The Daily Planet (then The Planet).
Living in Iowa from 1977 to 1984, he wrote his first book, Governor: An Oral Biography of Robert D. Ray, and worked in the commercial film business producing industrial films, television commercials and his first documentary films for Iowa Public Television.
In 1985, Jon moved back to New York, taking a job as managing editor of Record magazine, owned and published by Rolling Stone. From 1986 to 1998, he worked as a freelance magazine writer for numerous national and international publications, including The New York Times Magazine, Atlantic Monthly, New Republic, Outside, Men’s Journal and many more.

First National Geographic Assignment
In 1986, Jon befriended polar explorer Will Steger – who had just returned from a historic, unsupported dogsled adventure to the North Pole. As Steger was negotiating the rights to the story of his upcoming Trans-Antarctica expedition, he introduced Jon to editors at the National Geographic Magazine who assigned Jon to cover Steger’s seven-month-long crossing of Antarctica by dogsled in 1989–1990.

OCEANS 8
From 1998 to 2008, Jon’s OCEANS 8 project, a series of expeditions to explore the world's ocean from the seat of a sea kayak, allowed Jon and his teams—comprising some of the world's best photographers, filmmakers, scientists and navigators—to reach corners of the world rarely seen. The trips were funded primarily by grants from the National Geographic Expeditions Council and corporate sponsors including Mountain Hardwear, Timberland and others.

Jon began the project with the dream of visiting each of the seven continents, plus Oceania. Comprising eight adventures, the long-term project took Jon and his teams to the heart of the Aleutian Islands, down the coast of Vietnam, through the Tuamotu Atolls in French Polynesia, across the high plains of Bolivia/Chile/Argentina, and up the wild coastline of Gabon in West Africa. Jon explored Croatia's Dalmatian Coast, and visited Tasmania in 2006. In February 2008, Jon and his team completed the final expedition in the 10-year-long project, along the Antarctic Peninsula.

Stories from each OCEANS 8 expedition resulted in books, magazines, lectures, television programs and educational curriculum for the National Geographic Society.

Antarctica 
After Jon’s first trip to Antarctica with Will Steger, he developed a passion for the continent and has made many trips back since, to both the high, cold interior and along its 600-mile Peninsula.  In 2008 Jon completed his ten-year OCEANS 8 project with a trip to the Larsen Ice Shelf and the Antarctic Peninsula, which is the subject of his 2009 film, TERRA ANTARCTICA: Rediscovering the Seventh Continent. The high-definition, hour-long film chronicles Bowermaster’s exploration of the Peninsula by sea kayak, foot and small plane and was named the best "Ocean Issues" film at the 2009 BLUE Ocean Film Festival in Savannah, Georgia in June 2009.

Hudson River Stories 
Jon and his team at Oceans 8 Films have made more than twenty short films (5–25 minutes each) in the Hudson Valley of New York, where Jon has lived for over thirty years. Hudson River Stories is the result of Jon's dedication to telling stories – environmental, cultural, political – about what was going on in his own backyard.

The Hudson Valley is known as the birthplace of the American environmental movement, its main geographic attraction being the Hudson River, which some call America's First River, or simply America's River. Initially the Hudson River Stories project focused on environmental risks (oil trains carrying explosive cargo; a leaky nuclear power plant on the river’s edge; PCBs polluting the river and shutting down its fishery), but slowly morphed into more optimistic and hopeful stories (efforts to preserve the last remnants of Native American corn; a profile of Pete Seeger’s “Clearwater,” the environmental/education sloop celebrating its 50th anniversary; the successful undamming of tributaries allowing complete ecosystems to return).

Green Radio Hour with Jon Bowermaster 
Since March 2018 Jon has hosted the Green Radio Hour with Jon Bowermaster radio show and podcast. Broadcast live on Radio Kingston each Sunday, the conversations with local, national and international environmentalists, writers, filmmakers, artists and politicians focus on "green" issues. Guests have included Bill McKibben, Carl Safina, Wade David, Rep. Antonio Delgado and State Senator Michelle Hinchey, Josh Fox, Michael Mann, Paul Hawken, Andy Revkin, Ian Urbina and many more.

Link to the archives of conversations can be found here.

Media coverage
Jon’s books, films and adventures have received significant media coverage in a wide range of outlets including The New York Times, National Geographic, The Washington Post, Scientific American, Men’s Journal, ABC's Good Morning America, National Geographic Adventure, The Huffington Post, Condé Nast Traveler, Sierra Trading Post, PlumTV, EarthKeepers, Voice of America, ABC News, Forbes.com, Canoe & Kayak, Wend, Adventure Kayak, Paddler and Men’s Vogue

Awards and grants

 2019, Human Rights Watch Film Festival Amsterdam, "Ghost Fleet" Best Activist Documentary Award and BNNVARA Audience Award
 2019, World Wildlife Day Living Oceans, "Ghost Fleet" Best 'People and Oceans' Film 
 2019, Wild & Scenic Environmental Film Festival, "Ghost Fleet" Spirit of Activism Award, John de Graaf Environmental Filmmaking Award
 2018, Hudson River Maritime Museum, Roger W. Mabie Award
 2018, Food & Water Watch, Climate Change Champion
 2018, New York Wild Film Festival, "City on the Water" Best Wild NY Film 
 2017, Best Shorts, "Restoring the Clearwater" Award of Excellence
 2017, Center of Discovery, Green Shovel Award
 2017, Impact Docs Awards, "Restoring the Clearwater" Award of Excellence
 2016, Accolade Global Film Competition, Humanitarian Award Winner, "Dear President Obama" Grand Prize
 2016, Accolade Global Film Competition Winner, "Dear President Obama" Award of Excellence
 2016, IndieFest, "Dear President Obama" Winner
 2016, IndieFest, "Dear President Obama" Humanitarian Award
 2016, Impact Docs Awards, "After the Spill" Award of Excellence
 2016, Parajanov-Vartanov Institute's Doc LA Film Festival, "Dear President Obama"
 2014, Blue Ocean Festival, "Antarctica, On the Edge" Best Exploration and Innovation
 2014, Catskill Mountainkeeper, Keeper of the Catskills Award
 2013, Wild & Scenic Environmental Film Festival, "Dear Governor Cuomo" Best of Theme 
 2011, CMS Vatavaran International Film Festival, "SoLa, Louisiana Water Stories" Best of Festival
 2011, Columbus International Film Festival, "SoLa, Louisiana Water Stories"
 2009, BLUE Ocean Film Festival, "Terra Antarctica" Best Ocean Issues Film
 2008, Croatia’s "Golden Pen" award
 2008, "Birthplace of the Winds," Best Adventure Travel film, Reel Paddling Film Festival
 2007, Santa Barbara Ocean Film Festival, "OCEANS 8" Best Oceans Series
 2007, Vancouver Mountain Film Festival, "Terra Antarctica" Best of Festival
 2006, Explorer's Festival, Lodz, Poland
 1999, Lowell Thomas award for Environmental Reporting
 1998–2008, six grants from National Geographic Expeditions Council

Bibliography
 Governor: An Oral Biography of Robert D. Ray, 1987
 Saving the Earth: A Citizen's Guide to Environmental Action, co-authored with Will Steger, 1990
 Crossing Antarctica, co-authored with Will Steger, 1993
 The Adventures and Misadventures of Peter Beard In Africa, 1993
 Over the Top of the World, co-authored with Will Steger, 1999
 Birthplace of the Winds: Adventuring in Alaska's Islands of Fire and Ice, 2001
 Aleutian Adventure: Kayaking in the Birthplace of the Winds, 2001
 Alone Against the Sea and Other True Adventures, 2004
 Descending the Dragon: My Journey Down the Coast of Vietnam, 2008
 Wildebeest in a Rainstorm: Profiles of Our Most Intriguing Adventurers, Conservationists, Shagbags and Wanderers, 2009
 Oceans: The Threats To Our Seas and What You Can Do To Turn The Tide, 2010

Filmography
 Ghost Fleet VR, 2019
 Ghost Fleet, 2018
 Hudson River Stories
 The Hudson, A River At Risk, 2014-2016 
 PCBs, A Toxic Legacy 
 A Pipeline Runs Through It 
 Anchors Away 
 Bomb Trains on the Hudson 
 The Long Shadow of Indian Point 
 A Bridge Over Troubled Waters 
 High Voltage / Dark Shadow 
 Hope on the Hudson, 2016-2018 
 Seeds of Hope 
 City on the Water 
 Restoring the Clearwater 
 Growing with the Grain 
 Source to Sea 
 Undamming the Hudson 
 Keeping Carbon 
 Farmscape Ecology
 The Wonder of the Bobolink
 Sink or Swim, 2015
 Dear President Obama, 2014
 Paradise is There, 2014
 Dear Governor Brown, 2014
 After the Spill, 2014
 Antarctica 3D: On the Edge, 2014
 Dear Governor Cuomo, 2012
 SoLA: A Louisiana Water Story, 2010
 TERRA ANTARCTICA, 2009
 What Would Darwin Think? Man Versus Nature, 2008
 Sea Kayaking Adventures, National Geographic Channel, 2004-2007
 Birthplace of the Winds: Sea Kayaking Alaska, 2006
 The Lost Coast of Gabon: Sea Kayaking West Africa, 2006
 Around Tasmania: Sea Kayaking Australia, 2006
 Into the Altiplano Part 1: Sea Kayaking Argentina, Bolivia & Chile, 2006
 Into the Altiplano Part 2: Sea Kayaking Argentina, Bolivia & Chile, 2006
 Borderland: Sea Kayaking Croatia, 2006
 A Slow Boat to Somewhere: Exploring French Polynesia, 2004
 The Dangerous Archipelago: Sea Kayaking French Polynesia, 2004
 Descending the Dragon, National Geographic Explorer, 2002

Lectures
 National Geographic Live!, Washington D.C. (2000, 2003, 2005, 2007, 2009, 2010, 2014, 2016, 2017)
 National Geographic Society "Quest for Adventure" Lecture (2008, 2004, 2002, 2001), Washington, D.C.
 Royal Geographical Society, London
 Harvard Traveler's Club
 Princeton University
 Yale University
 The Explorer’s Club, New York City (2001, 2003, 2007, 2010, 2014, 2016, 2017, 2019)
 Commonwealth Club, San Francisco
 TEDxAlbany
 TEDxSchenectady
 Aspen Institute, Aspen, CO
 Channel Thirteen/WNET’s Celebration of Teaching and Learning, New York
 American Museum of Natural History "Polar Weekend," New York
 Golden Gate Institute, San Francisco
 Adventures in Travel Expo (Seattle, Washington D.C., New York, Chicago)
 Wild & Scenic Environmental Film Festival, CA
 Santa Barbara Ocean Film Festival ("Best Television Series" award), Santa Barbara, CA
 Macy’s, New York
 REI, Seattle, WA
 Norwegian Tourism Board
 Croatia Tourism Board
 Cigna Insurance Annual Meeting, New York
 Banff Mountain Film and Book Festival, Banff, Canada
 Telluride Mountain Film Festival, Telluride, CO
 San Francisco Ocean Film Festival, San Francisco

References

External links
  www.jonbowermaster.com
 Facebook
 
 Oceans 8 Films
 Hudson River Stories
 Green Radio Hour
 Instagram
 Twitter

1954 births
Living people
American explorers
Explorers of the Arctic
American environmentalists
Sustainability advocates